"Glu" is a song by American singer Usher. It was released as a single on March 17, 2023, via the record label gamma.

Background
After the single was first teased on Saint Valentine's Day on February 14, 2023, Usher said: "I think it is striking conversation about R&B, striking conversation about sex, and it’s striking conversation about that connection. And I like that. It feels connected. It feels like people want it. People feel like they want to have fun."

Music video
The official lyric video was released on March 17, 2023. The official music video is expected imminently; co-starring Lori Harvey, the video is Usher's directorial debut.

References

2023 songs
2023 singles
Usher (musician) songs
Songs written by Usher (musician)
Songs written by Sean Garrett
Songs written by Lil Jon